The B9176 also known as the "Struie" is a  road from Alness to Bonar Bridge. in the Scottish Highlands.
This road is the main road from the north-west coast to Inverness despite the "B classification" This road also has a long history of being haunted at the Strathy Corner.

References

Roads in Scotland